USA-227, known before launch as NRO Launch 27 (NROL-27), is an American communications satellite which was launched in 2011. It is operated by the United States National Reconnaissance Office.

Launch 
United Launch Alliance (ULA) performed the launch of USA-227, using a Delta IV-M+(4,2) launch vehicle flying from Space Launch Complex 37B at the Cape Canaveral Air Force Station (CCAFS). The launch occurred at 23:38:00 UTC on 11 March 2011. Following liftoff the rocket flew east, placing the satellite into a geosynchronous transfer orbit. By 23:43 UTC, official updates on the status of the launch had been discontinued.

Mission 
Whilst details of its mission are officially classified, amateur observers have identified USA-227 as being a third-generation Satellite Data System satellite in geosynchronous orbit. The first amateur observation of the satellite was made on 6 April 2011, when the spacecraft was located at a longitude of 30.4° west. SDS satellites are used to relay data from American reconnaissance satellites to ground stations.

References 

Spacecraft launched in 2011
Spacecraft launched by Delta IV rockets
USA satellites